The Géologique de Haute-Provence National Nature Reserve (RNN73) is a national nature reserve in Provence-Alpes-Côte d'Azur. Established in 1984, it covers 269.316 hectares over 18 sites in the Alpes-de-Haute-Provence and Var. Located between the Verdon and Durance rivers, it is an area designated for its landscape diversity, witness of the geological past of the Earth, and is the largest geological reserve in Europe.

Location
The domain of the nature reserve spreads over 18 sites bearing fossils and outcrops with a cumulated area of 269.316 hectares, over the communes of Barles, Barrême, Chaudon-Norante, Clumanc, Digne-les-Bains, Entrages, Hautes-Duyes, La Javie, La Robine-sur-Galabre, Saint-Lions, Senez and Tartonne.

It is completed by a protection area which regulates fossil collections, spreading over 52 communes in the Alpes-de-Haute-Provence and 7 in Var.
The total area of the protected area covers more than 2300 km2 and covers the communes of Aiglun, Angles, Archail, Authon, Auzet, Barles, Barras, Barrême, Beaujeu, Beynes, Blieux, Bras-d'Asse, Le Brusquet, Castellane, Le Castellard-Mélan, Le Chaffaut-Saint-Jurson, Champtercier,  Châteauredon, Chaudon-Norante, Clumanc, Digne-les-Bains, Draix, Entrages, Estoublon, Hautes-Duyes, La Javie, Lambruisse, Majastres, Mallemoisson, Marcoux, Mézel, Mirabeau, Montclar, Moriez, Moustiers-Sainte-Marie, La Palud-sur-Verdon, Prads-Haute-Bléone, La Robine-sur-Galabre, Rougon, Saint-André-les-Alpes, Saint-Geniez, Saint-Jacques, Saint-Julien-d'Asse, Saint-Lions, Selonnet, Senez, Seyne-les-Alpes, Tartonne, Thoard, Verdaches, Vergons et Le Vernet in Alpes-de-Haute-Provence and Bargème, Brénon, Le Bourguet, Châteauvieux, Comps-sur-Artuby, La Martre and Trigance in Var.

History of the site and reserve

130 millions of years ago, giant ammonites more than one meter wide colonized the ocean that then covered this area of the Préalpes.

Geologic patrimony

Those fossils can be discovered either in the Musée Promenade at Digne-les-Bains, or in situ in the folded and fractured layers of geological sites.

The most famous site is the Dalle à ammonites, on the RP 900 at 1.5 km north of Digne-les-Bains. With a 60° incline, it bears over 1 500 ammonites, 90% of which belonging to the species Coroniceras multicostatum from the Sinemurian (Early Jurassic). Those ammonites could attain a diameter of 70 cm. Remains of nautilus, belemnites, Pecten and other bivalves can also be seen. The deposit thickness is estimated to be around 20 cm, laid down over a 100 000-year period.

The La Robine ichthyosaur, displayed in the Digne museum, lived during the late Toarcian, 185 millions of years ago. This marine reptile was quickly buried, which limited its decomposition. Its conservation is due to paleogeographic conditions favouring the tilting of blocks, caused by the rifting following the opening of the Piemont-Liguria Ocean.

At Castellane, the museum of the Maison Nature et Patrimoine takes visitors back for the last 40 millions of years. At that time a warm sea covered this part of the Alpes-de-Hautes-Provence and was populated with marine mammals such as sirenians. Also known as sea cows, as they mostly eat algae and aquatic plants, they gave birth to the ancient myth of mermaids.

Touristic and educational interest
The museum of Castellane, Sisteron and Digne-les-Bains offers marked discovery tours, accessible to anyone.

Administration, management plan, regulations

Once managed by the Association pour la gestion de la réserve géologique de Haute Provence, established in 1984, the nature reserve is now under the gestion of the Departmental Council of Alpes-de-Haute-Provence.

Reglementations forbid collections and extractions of any fossils. The collection of naturally released fossils is tolerated, but only in limited quantities. It is designated as a UNESCO Global Geopark, in the Global Geoparks Network, and it was one of the four founding members of the European Geoparks Network.

Tools and legal status
The nature reserve was established under a decree of the 31 October 1984.

References

External links
 

Protected areas established in 1984
Regional natural parks of France
Geography of Alpes-de-Haute-Provence
Geography of Var (department)
Tourist attractions in Alpes-de-Haute-Provence
Tourist attractions in Var (department)
Geologic formations of France
Jurassic Europe
Fossiliferous stratigraphic units of Europe
Paleontology in France
Alpes-de-Haute-Provence
Var (department)